Edgar Cuntapay Gacutan is the bishop appointed by the Holy See to the Roman Catholic Diocese of Sendai, Japan. He is the first Filipino bishop to be appointed in Japan.

Early life and education 

Edgar was born in Enrile, Cagayan, Philippines on 23 September 1964. Edgar completed his Philosophical studies at St. Louis University in Baguio and Theology at Maryhill School of Theology in Manila.  He was transferred to Japan as a seminary student and after his internship in Japan, he returned to Manila to complete his theological studies.

Priesthood 
On 23 April 1994, Gacutan was ordained a priest for the Congregation of the Immaculate Heart of Mary. After his ordination, he was sent to Japan. He served as an assistant pastor in Kongo church, Osaka. He was part of the team ministry in Osaka for six years. He was appointed superior of the Japanese CICM Province.

Episcopate 
Gacutan was appointed bishop of the Roman Catholic Diocese of Sendai by Pope Francis on 8 December 2021 and was consecrated by Tarcisio Isao Kikuchi on 19 March 2022.

References 

1964 births
Living people
Filipino Roman Catholic bishops
Sendai
21st-century Roman Catholic bishops in Japan
Bishops appointed by Pope Francis